The Netherlands women's youth national handball team is the national under–17 Handball team of the Netherlands. Controlled by the Netherlands Handball Association it represents the country in international matches.

History

Youth Olympic Games 

 Champions   Runners up   Third place   Fourth place

IHF World Championship 

 Champions   Runners up   Third place   Fourth place

European Championship 
 Champions   Runners up   Third place   Fourth place

References

External links 
Official website  

Handball in the Netherlands
Women's national youth handball teams
Handball